Bolognetta is a stop of Line C of the Rome Metro. It is located at the junction of Via Bolognetta and Via Motta Camastra, in the Roman frazione of Borgata Finocchio.

The stop was renovated and it re-opened as part of the new Metro line on 9 November 2014.

External links

Rome Metro Line C stations
Railway stations opened in 2014
2014 establishments in Italy
Railway stations in Italy opened in the 21st century